Events in 1990 in Japanese television.

Debuts

Ongoing shows
Music Fair, music (1964–present)
Mito Kōmon, jidaigeki (1969-2011)
Sazae-san, anime (1969–present)
Ōoka Echizen, jidaigeki (1970-1999)
FNS Music Festival, music (1974–present)
Panel Quiz Attack 25, game show (1975–present)
Doraemon, anime (1979-2005)
Kiteretsu Daihyakka, anime (1988-1996)
Soreike! Anpanman, anime (1988–present)
YAWARA! a fashionable judo girl, anime (1989-1992)
Ranma ½ Nettohen, anime (1989−1992)
Dragon Ball Z, anime (1989–1996)
Downtown no Gaki no Tsukai ya Arahende!!, game show (1989–present)

Hiatus

Endings

See also
1990 in anime
List of Japanese television dramas
1990 in Japan
List of Japanese films of 1990

References